Jānis Vanags (born 25 May 1958, Liepāja) is a Latvian Lutheran Archbishop. Since 1993 he has been the Archbishop of Riga in the Evangelical Lutheran Church of Latvia. 

Vanags is seen as conservative on theological or moral issues and opposes women's ordination. He also opposes abortion and euthanasia, and encourages homosexual people to be chaste. He presided over the agreement of fellowship with the Lutheran Church–Missouri Synod of the United States.

Background and education
Vanags studied at Liepaja 5th High School (1965–1976), the Latvian State University Chemistry Department (1976–1982), and the Lutheran Theological Seminar (1984–1989). He worked as a chemistry teacher in Riga Vilis Lacis 31st High School (1982–1985).

Religious career
Vanags was ordained as a pastor in 1985. He was appointed by the Synod to lead the Evangelical Lutheran Church of Latvia in 1993, following the death of Kārlis Gailītis, the previous archbishop, in a car crash.

Lutheranism is the leading faith in Latvia, with a quarter of the country's 2.4 million population counted by the church as active members. Vanags has returned to the historic practice of the Lutheran Church by refusing to ordain women since his appointment in 1993.

Homosexuality controversy
Archbishop Vanags has been criticised for his perceived homophobia, particularly when he deposed (defrocked) 36-year-old pastor Maris Sants from Holy Orders. Sants was known for ministering to AIDS patients, but Archbishop Vanags deposed the priest “due to his promotion of a tolerant attitude to homosexuality”. Through a statement by Mara Grigola, secretary to Vanags, he accused Sants of expressing in public "information that is against Lutheran doctrine". He also stated, "Persons who accept homosexual orientation as normal cannot work in the Latvian Evangelical Lutheran Church". Sants told AFP that his dismissal came without warning, following an interview he gave with Radio Free Europe/Radio Liberty in which he discussed his own homosexuality. "It's the practice in our church to dismiss people and not consult them. The church is not only conservative, but going backwards" said Sants, who added that he had been criticised by church officials for ministering to AIDS sufferers.

Vanags contributed an essay to the 2002 anti-homosexuality book Homoseksuālisms - cilvēces negods un posts, edited by Aivars Garda, the founder of the ultranationalist Latvian National Front. "Now homosexuals are recognized as a minority so in principle after them pedophiles may also be recognized as a minority", Vanags was quoted as saying in a January 2002 article in the daily Rīgas Balss.  He is also quoted as saying, "What we could actually say to our brothers and sisters who are in this homosexual orientation, is that they're welcome to receive all that the Gospel means for the church, but we cannot accept their homosexual relationships as a normal alternative to marriage".

References

External links

Biography at the Lutheran Church website
Latvia Revived: interview in Touchstone, May 2001
Article in "Touchstone", December 2010
Latvian Lutheran pastor defrocked for promoting homosexuality. Agence France-Presse, May 24, 2002

1958 births
Living people
People from Liepāja
Latvian Lutheran clergy
Latvian Lutheran bishops
Latvian bishops
Lutheran archbishops of Riga
20th-century Lutheran archbishops
21st-century Lutheran archbishops
Recipients of the Order of the Cross of Terra Mariana, 3rd Class